Eddie Lo is a Chinese-Canadian table tennis player.

References
 

Living people
Canadian male table tennis players
Pan American Games medalists in table tennis
Pan American Games gold medalists for Canada
Pan American Games bronze medalists for Canada
Place of birth missing (living people)
Table tennis players at the 1979 Pan American Games
Medalists at the 1979 Pan American Games
1959 births